Brillion High School is a public secondary school located in Brillion, Wisconsin, approximately 20 miles south of Green Bay. Enrollment is for grades 9 through 12 with approximately 320 students.

Demographics
BHS is 91 percent white, six percent Hispanic, and all other races make up the remaining three percent. Approximately a quarter of Brillion students qualify for free or reduced-price lunch.

Academics
Brillion students have the opportunity to take Advanced Placement classes. About a quarter of students take AP classes.

In 2007, local company Ariens gave BHS $1.5 million to make a larger STEM area in the school.

In March 2018, the school announced a decision to change from semester scheduling to trimester scheduling for the 2018–2019 school year.

Extracurriculars
BHS has worked with Special Olympics to bring a chapter of Project Unify to the school, which helps special needs students socially.

Performing arts
Brillion had a competitive show choir in the 1990s; the program lived on as a noncompetitive swing choir in the 2000s and early 2010s. A 600-seat theater, the Endries Performing Arts Center, is located on the BHS campus.

References

External links
Official Website
Brillion School District on the Wisconsin Cooperative Educational Service Agency

Public high schools in Wisconsin
Schools in Calumet County, Wisconsin